The 2018 Yap gubernatorial election took place on Tuesday, November 6, 2018, to elect the Governor and Lieutenant Governor of the Yap State in the Federated States of Micronesia to a four-year term in office.
 The election coincided with the Yap State general election, including legislative contests to select Senators of the Yap State Legislature.
 
Incumbent Governor Tony Ganngiyan, who was elected in 2014, was seeking re-election for a second term.

10 seats of the Yap State Legislature were also up for election.

Results

Jerry G. Fagolimul, Vincent A. Figir, Nicholas Figirlaarwon, Joseph Giliko, Kensley Ikosia, John Mafel, John J. Masiwemai, Jesse Raglmar-Subolmar, Theodore Rutun, and Joseph B. Tiuchemal were elected to the Yap State Legislature.

References

2018 in the Federated States of Micronesia
Yap
Elections in the Federated States of Micronesia
Non-partisan elections
Yap